Daeryeong (sometimes spelled as taeryong) is a Korean military rank used by the armed forces of South Korea.  The rank is denoted by three large starbursts worn as a collar insignia.  The rank is uniform throughout the Korean Army, Air Force, and Navy.  The equivalent rank in most western militaries is colonel, with captain being the equivalent naval rank.

Military ranks of South Korea